Ellinwood is a city in the southeast corner of Barton County, Kansas, United States.  As of the 2020 census, the population of the city was 2,011.

History

19th century

For millennia, the land now known as Kansas was inhabited by Native Americans.  In 1803, most of modern Kansas was secured by the United States as part of the Louisiana Purchase.  In 1854, the Kansas Territory was organized, then in 1861 Kansas became the 34th U.S. state.  In 1867, Barton County was founded.

The first claim at Ellinwood was staked in 1871 when it was certain the Santa Fe railroad would be completed nearby.  The railroad was finished in 1872 and the city was named after Colonel John R. Ellinwood, a civil engineer working for the Santa Fe railroad. Although neither the founder nor the original settlers were German, many of the main streets were given German names, in order to appeal to German immigrant buyers.

In 1878, Atchison, Topeka and Santa Fe Railway and parties from Marion County and McPherson County chartered the Marion and McPherson Railway Company.  In 1879, a branch line was built from Florence to McPherson, in 1880 it was extended to Lyons, in 1881 it was extended to Ellinwood.  The line was leased and operated by the Atchison, Topeka and Santa Fe Railway.  The line from Florence to Marion, was abandoned in 1968.  In 1992, the line from Marion to McPherson was sold to Central Kansas Railway. In 1993, after heavy flood damage, the line from Marion to McPherson was abandoned.  The original branch line connected Florence, Marion, Canada, Hillsboro, Lehigh, Canton, Galva, McPherson, Conway, Windom, Little River, Mitchell, Lyons, Chase, Ellinwood.

20th century
In 1973, the rock band Kansas rented the Ellinwood Opera House as a 'tryout show' for New York record executive Wally Gold, using free beer as a marketing tool, and charged a USD $0.25 entry fee to help cover some of their expenses.  The story is told in the 2015 documentary Miracles Out of Nowhere.

Geography
Ellinwood is located at  (38.356226, -98.580873). The city is situated along the path of the historic Santa Fe Trail. Ellinwood is also located just north of the Arkansas River, roughly in the area where it makes its "great bend" to the southeast en route to its final destination, the Mississippi River.

Climate
The climate in this area is characterized by hot, humid summers and generally mild to cool winters.  According to the Köppen Climate Classification system, Ellinwood has a humid subtropical climate, abbreviated "Cfa" on climate maps.

Area attractions
 Downtown Tunnels

Demographics

2010 census
As of the census of 2010, there were 2,131 people, 910 households, and 601 families living in the city. The racial makeup of the city was 96.5% White, 0.3% African American, 0.6% Native American, 0.9% from other races, and 1.7% from two or more races. Hispanic or Latino of any race were 2.9% of the population.

There were 910 households, of which 28.9% had children under the age of 18 living with them, 54.1% were married couples living together, 8.1% had a female householder with no husband present, 3.8% had a male householder with no wife present, and 34.0% were non-families. 30.3% of all households were made up of individuals, and 14.1% had someone living alone who was 65 years of age or older. The average household size was 2.28 and the average family size was 2.80.

The median age in the city was 43.7 years. 22.7% of residents were under the age of 18; 8.3% were between the ages of 18 and 24; 20% were from 25 to 44; 27.5% were from 45 to 64; and 21.6% were 65 years of age or older. The gender makeup of the city was 48.4% male and 51.6% female.

2000 census
As of the census of 2000, there were 2,164 people, 906 households, and 594 families living in the city. The racial makeup of the city was 96.90% White, 0.23% African American, 0.83% Native American, 0.05% Asian, 0.60% from other races, and 1.39% from two or more races. Hispanic or Latino of any race were 1.85% of the population.

There were 906 households, out of which 31.5% had children under the age of 18 living with them, 53.1% were married couples living together, 9.7% had a female householder with no husband present, and 34.4% were non-families. 31.9% of all households were made up of individuals, and 17.8% had someone living alone who was 65 years of age or older. The average household size was 2.33 and the average family size was 2.95.

In the city, the population was spread out, with 26.2% under the age of 18, 6.3% from 18 to 24, 23.8% from 25 to 44, 21.7% from 45 to 64, and 22.0% who were 65 years of age or older. The median age was 41 years. For every 100 females, there were 85.6 males. For every 100 females age 18 and over, there were 82.2 males.

The median income for a household in the city was $29,596, and the median income for a family was $42,292. Males had a median income of $29,792 versus $19,194 for females. The per capita income for the city was $15,811. About 7.3% of families and 10.0% of the population were below the poverty line, including 9.0% of those under age 18 and 15.1% of those age 65 or over.

Education
The community is served by Ellinwood USD 355 public school district.

Transportation
U.S. Route 56 runs through the city.

Notable person
 Wally Hickel (1919–2010), Governor of Alaska and Secretary of the Interior

See also
 Santa Fe Trail

References

Further reading

External links

 City of Ellinwood
 Ellinwood - Directory of Public Officials
 USD 355, local school district
 Ellinwood Kansas Historical Society
 , from Hatteberg's People on KAKE TV news
 , from Hatteberg's People on KAKE TV news
 Ellinwood city map, KDOT

Cities in Kansas
Cities in Barton County, Kansas
Kansas populated places on the Arkansas River